This is a list of the winners and nominations of Tony Award for the Best Performance by a Featured Actor in a Musical. The award has been given since 1947, but the nominees who did not win have only been publicly announced since 1956.

Winner and nominees

1940s

1950s

1960s

1970s

1980s

1990s

2000s

2010s

2020s

Multiple winners

3 Wins
 Hinton Battle

2 Wins
 David Burns
 Boyd Gaines
 Russell Nype
 Hiram Sherman

Multiple nominees

 4 Nominations
 Danny Burstein

 3 Nominations
 René Auberjonois
 Hinton Battle
 Michael Cerveris
 André De Shields
 Gregg Edelman
 Christopher Fitzgerald
 Marc Kudisch
 Scott Wise

 2 Nominations
 Bruce Adler
 Tom Aldredge
 Roger Bart
 Gary Beach
 Joel Blum
 Christian Borle
 David Burns
 Norbert Leo Butz
 Jack Cassidy
 Robin de Jesús
 Brandon Victor Dixon
 Boyd Gaines
 David Alan Grier
 Harry Groener
 Ron Holgate
 George S. Irving
 Michael McGrath
 John McMartin
 Russell Nype
 Brad Oscar
 Gilbert Price
 Charles Nelson Reilly
 Michael Rupert
 Hiram Sherman
 Christopher Sieber
 Brandon Uranowitz
 Edward Winter
 Samuel E. Wright

Character nomination total
4 nominations
Herbie from Gypsy

3 nominations
Herr Schultz from Cabaret

2 nominations
Alfred P. Doolittle from My Fair Lady
Bruce Granit from On the Twentieth Century
Cinderella's Prince / The Wolf from Into the Woods
Cornelius Hackl from Hello, Dolly!
Eddie Ryan from Funny Girl
H.C. Curry from 110 in the Shade
Hysterium from A Funny Thing Happened on the Way to the Forum
Jim from Big River
John Jasper / Mr. Clive Paget from The Mystery of Edwin Drood
Juan Perón from Evita
Judas Iscariot from Jesus Christ Superstar
Lord Evelyn Oakleigh from Anything Goes
Luther Billis from South Pacific
Og from Finian's Rainbow
Oscar from Sweet Charity
Senex from A Funny Thing Happened on the Way to the Forum
Sporting Life from Porgy and Bess

Productions with multiple nominations
 My Fair Lady – Robert Coote and Stanley Holloway
 The Music Man – David Burns (winner) and Iggie Wolfington
 Fiorello! – Tom Bosley (winner) and Howard da Silva
 The Sound of Music – Theodore Bikel and Kurt Kasznar
 Bye Bye Birdie – Dick Gautier and Dick Van Dyke (winner)
 A Funny Thing Happened on the Way to the Forum – David Burns (winner) and Jack Gilford
 Cabaret – Joel Grey (winner) and Edward Winter
 1776 – William Daniels (refused nomination) and Ronald Holgate (winner)
 Promises, Promises – Larry Haines and Edward Winter
 Coco – René Auberjonois (winner) and George Rose
 A Chorus Line – Robert LuPone and Sammy Williams (winner)
 Side by Side by Sondheim – David Kernan and Ned Sherrin
 Working – Steven Boockvor and Rex Everhart
 Evita – Bob Gunton and Mandy Patinkin (winner)
 Dreamgirls – Obba Babatundé and Cleavant Derricks (winner)
 Cats – Harry Groener and Stephen Hanan
 The Tap Dance Kid – Hinton Battle (winner) and Samuel E. Wright
 Big River – René Auberjonois, Daniel H. Jenkins, and Ron Richardson (winner)
 The Mystery of Edwin Drood – John Herrera and Howard McGillin
 Me and My Girl – George S. Irving and Timothy Jerome
 Anything Goes – Anthony Heald and Bill McCutcheon (winner)
 Black and Blue – Bunny Briggs and Savion Glover
 Miss Saigon – Hinton Battle (winner) and Willy Falk
 The Who's Tommy – Michael Cerveris and Paul Kandel
 Show Boat – Michel Bell and Joel Blum
 The Life – Chuck Cooper (winner) and Sam Harris
 Fosse – Desmond Richardson and Scott Wise
 Kiss Me, Kate – Michael Berresse, Michael Mulheren and Lee Wilkof
 The Full Monty – John Ellison Conlee and André DeShields
 The Producers – Roger Bart, Gary Beach (winner) and Brad Oscar
 Hairspray – Dick Latessa (winner) and Corey Reynolds
 Movin' Out – Michael Cavanaugh and Keith Roberts
 Assassins – Michael Cerveris (winner) and Denis O'Hare
 Monty Python's Spamalot – Michael McGrath and Christopher Sieber
 Billy Elliot the Musical – David Bologna and Gregory Jbara (winner)
 The Scottsboro Boys – Colman Domingo and Forrest McClendon
 The Gershwins' Porgy and Bess – Phillip Boykin and David Alan Grier
 An American in Paris – Brandon Uranowitz and Max von Essen
 Something Rotten! – Christian Borle (winner) and Brad Oscar
 Hamilton – Daveed Diggs (winner), Jonathan Groff, and Christopher Jackson
 Falsettos – Andrew Rannells and Brandon Uranowitz
 Ain't Too Proud – Jeremy Pope and Ephraim Sykes
 Hadestown – André De Shields (winner) and Patrick Page
 Moulin Rouge! – Danny Burstein (winner) and Sahr Ngaujah
 Jagged Little Pill – Derek Klena and Sean Allan Krill
 Paradise Square – Sidney DuPont and A.J. Shively

Multiple awards and nominations
Actors who have been nominated multiple times in any acting categories

Other statistics
 There was one tie in the history of this category, in 1959.
 The role of Herbie, in Gypsy, holds the record for most nominations in this category, with four:
 1960 – Jack Klugman
 1990 – Jonathan Hadary
 2003 – John Dossett
 2008 – Boyd Gaines (winner)
 Hinton Battle remains the most successful performer in the history of this category with a perfect score of three wins in three nominations. Danny Burstein has received the most nominations in this category with four, but has only been victorious once. Gregg Edelman, Marc Kudisch, and Christopher Fitzgerald have received three nominations but never won and are this category's biggest "losers." Coincidentally, Edelman and Kudisch were nominated and lost to Shuler Hensley in 2002.
 There has never been a consecutive winner in this category. There have been, though, some consecutive nominations. Jack Cassidy was consecutively nominated in 1964 and 1965, while Bruce Adler achieved the same honor in 1991 and 1992. Cassidy won in 1964, for his portrayal of Steve Kodaly, in She Loves Me.
 The record for the longest span between wins is held by Hiram Sherman, whose wins for Two's Company, in 1953, and How Now, Dow Jones, in 1968, are set apart by 15 years.
 The record for the longest span between nominations is held by John McMartin, whose nominations for Sweet Charity, in 1966, and High Society, in 1998, are set apart by 32 years. McMartin never won a Tony Award in this category.
 The oldest winner in this category is Dick Latessa who was 73 when he won for Hairspray in 2003. The youngest winner is Frankie Michaels who won for Mame in 1966 at age 11.

References

External links
Tony Awards Official site

Tony Awards
Awards established in 1947
1947 establishments in the United States
Theatre acting awards